William Monk R.E. (1863–1937) was a British etcher, wood-engraver and painter in oils and watercolours.

Born in Chester, the son of gunmaker William Henry Monk, he studied art at the Chester School of Art and etching at the Antwerp Academy, Belgium.

He was an Associate of the Royal Society of Painter-Etchers and Engravers from 1884 and elected a full member (R.E.) in 1899.

He lived in London from 1892 and published the "Calendorium Londonense" or "London Almanack" of his illustrations of London from 1903, and in Chesham Bois, Bucks from 1911-1915. The Wolverhampton company of Mander Brothers published a series of his views as calendars in the 1920s and 1930s.
He returned to Chester in 1933.

Examples of his work can be found in the British Museum, the Victoria and Albert Museum and the Imperial War Museum. He exhibited at the Royal Academy in the Summer Exhibition from  1894 to 1933.

In 2013 the Grosvenor Museum, Chester, held an exhibition of his work: 'A Vision of England: Etchings by William Monk'.

References

1863 births
1937 deaths
English etchers
People from Chester
19th-century English painters
English male painters
20th-century English painters
Guild of St George